Commerce de Bordeaux was a  74-gun ship of the line of the French Navy. She was funded by a don des vaisseaux donation from Bordeaux.

Renamed Timoléon in February 1794, she took part in the Battle of the Nile under captain Louis-Léonce Trullet. In the confusion of the battle, her rudder was damaged by misdirected fire from the neighbouring Généreux. She fought for three days, eventually running aground and set on fire by her crew. She exploded around noon on 2 August, the last fighting French ship of the battle.

See also
 List of ships of the line of France

References

Ships of the line of the French Navy
Téméraire-class ships of the line
Don des vaisseaux
Ships built in France
Maritime incidents in 1798
Ship fires
Scuttled vessels
Naval magazine explosions
Shipwrecks of Egypt
Shipwrecks in the Mediterranean Sea
1785 ships